Frank Willy Olafsen (born 20 April 1944) is a Norwegian former football player, bandy player and ice hockey player. With his club Skeid he won the Norwegian Football Cup three times, in 1963, 1965 and 1974, and the league in 1966. He played for the Norwegian national ice hockey team, and  participated at the Winter Olympics in 1964, where he placed tenth with the Norwegian team. 
 
He played eighteen matches for the national football team, and five matches for the national bandy team.

References

External links
 
 

1944 births
Living people
Ice hockey players at the 1964 Winter Olympics
Norwegian bandy players
Association football defenders
Norwegian footballers
Skeid Fotball players
Eliteserien players
Norwegian ice hockey players
Olympic ice hockey players of Norway
Sportspeople from Oslo
Norway international footballers
20th-century Norwegian people